The Augustan Society, Inc., headquartered in Orlando, Florida, was founded in 1957 to preserve material related to heraldry, genealogy, nobility, and orders of chivalry; and to further chivalric ideals in society. The Society moved to its current location from its long-time home in California in 2007. The Society's journal, The Augustan Omnibus, is published semi-annually.

Boasting one of North America's most complete libraries of some 20,000 volumes dedicated to nobility, chivalry, genealogy, and heraldry, the Society supports research in these fields. In addition to these main goals of fostering research and promoting chivalry, the Augustan Society has sub-groups of interest available to members. The first two were established to promote the ideals of the Society and are as follows:

 The Order of the Augustan Eagle, established to serve as the court of honor of the Augustan Society, as well as to set the privileges of the members of the Society.
 The Noble Company of the Rose, which exists to foster the true ideals of chivalry. Members fulfill their duties to their fellow men through an active practice of the Code of Chivalry and by individual and concerted charitable activities.

The other sub-groups are dedicated to providing kinship among members of various lineages, interests, and backgrounds, in the form of lineage societies. They are as follows:

 The Society of Descendants of the Latin Kingdom of Jerusalem, composed of members who descend from an individual who lived in the Holy Land during the Crusades, or belong to an Order of Chivalry which fought in the Holy Land, or have made a personal pilgrimage to the Holy Land.
 The Society of Descendants of Ireland, which was organized for the purpose of gathering together persons of Irish origin, and for preserving and cherishing the memories of our ancestors of Ireland, and to reflect with affection upon the Emerald Isle.
 The Society of Descendants of Scotland, which is composed of those who can submit a proven and unbroken lineage from a Scottish family who lived in Scotland for a minimum of three generations, or from a Scottish king.
 The Society of Descendants of the Conquest, which is made up of two groups, being those who can demonstrate unbroken descent from William the Conqueror and his wife Matilda of Flanders as well as those who can demonstrate unbroken descent from one of 39 companions they accept as having fought with William the Conqueror at the Battle of Hastings.

The Society also holds yearly conventions to gather members and promote research in Society areas of specialty. The 2014 gathering was to be held in Philadelphia, Pennsylvania.

See also
 Committee on Heraldry of the New England Historic Genealogical Society
 International Register of Arms

References

External links
 Augustan Society main website
 Augustan Society Online Store
 Augustan Society Library Catalog

American heraldry
Learned societies of the United States
Organizations established in 1957
1957 establishments in the United States